Andrew Langa (born 13 January 1965) is the former Zimbabwe government minister of Culture and Sports He is the Member of House of Assembly for Insiza North (ZANU-PF). Since 2005 he has been on the United States sanctions list.

References

Members of the National Assembly of Zimbabwe
Living people
ZANU–PF politicians
1965 births